Miracid is:

 A brand of fertilizer manufactured by Scotts Miracle-Gro
 A trade name for omeprazole, a proton pump inhibitor